John Reddan (born 16 January 1979 in Sixmilebridge, County Clare) is an Irish sportsperson.  He currently plays hurling in Warwickshire with John Mitchels and was a member of the Clare senior inter-county team from 1998 until 2004. He played midfield for the Clare team that made it to the All Ireland final in 2002 but lost out to Kilkenny. He was captain of the Clare team that won the All-Ireland Minor Hurling Championship in 1997.

He has had much success at club level with the Sixmilebridge winning 2 County Championships and a Munster Championship. He also played with Kilburn Gaels in London and also won a County Championship.

He also played football with the Clare minor team.

References

1979 births
Living people
Sixmilebridge hurlers
Clare inter-county hurlers
Clare inter-county Gaelic footballers